The Pleading Act 1711 (10 Ann c 28) was an Act of the Parliament of Great Britain.

This Act is chapter 18 in Ruffhead's Edition and chapter XVIII in the common printed editions.

The title from "to give" to "limited and" was repealed by section 1 of, and the Schedule to, the Statute Law Revision Act 1887.

Sections 1 and 2 were repealed by section 1 of, and the Schedule to, the Statute Law Revision Act 1867.

The whole Act, being an enactment which, as respects England and Wales, was rendered obsolete by the Law of Property Act 1922, was repealed for England and Wales on 1 January 1926.

References

Great Britain Acts of Parliament 1711